Murray Joseph Mendenhall (March 5, 1898 – July 27, 1972) was an American basketball coach.  Murray began coaching at the high school level, at New Castle in 1923, before moving to Ft. Wayne Central the following year, coaching the Tigers to the state championship in 1943. He also coached in the National Basketball Association (NBA) from 1949 to 1951 as the first coach of the Fort Wayne Pistons, and has been inducted into the Indiana Basketball Hall of Fame.  Prior to coaching the Pistons, he coached the now-defunct Anderson Packers of the National Basketball League.

His son, Murray Jr. played for him on the 1943 championship team, before being inducted into the United States Navy. Both Murray, Jr. and his son, Murray Mendenhall, III, coached high school basketball in Indiana.

External links

 BasketballReference.com: Murray Mendenhall
 

1898 births
1972 deaths
American men's basketball players
Anderson Packers coaches
Basketball coaches from Indiana
Basketball players from Indiana
DePauw Tigers football players
DePauw Tigers men's basketball players
Fort Wayne Pistons head coaches
High school basketball coaches in the United States
Players of American football from Indiana
People from Hendricks County, Indiana